Thomas Petersson (born August 24, 1962) is a Swedish actor and comedian from Halmstad.

Petersson grew up on a farm and after finishing high school he worked as a tractor technician, while doing amateur theater. Peter Wahlbeck noticed Petersson's comic talent and talked him into starting with stand up comedy. Petersson's breakthrough came with the TV show Släng dig i brunnen, which was broadcast from the comedy club Norra Brunn in Stockholm.

Petersson has appeared in many gameshows and panelshows on TV. He has competed twice in the popular show På spåret. As an actor, he has mainly appeared in farces.

References

Swedish male comedians
Swedish male television actors
20th-century Swedish comedians
21st-century Swedish comedians
20th-century Swedish male actors
21st-century Swedish male actors
1962 births
Actors from Halmstad
Living people